The 2021–22 season was the 12th season in the existence of AFC Chindia Târgoviște and the club's third consecutive season in the top flight of Romanian football. In addition to the domestic league, Chindia Târgoviște participating in this season's edition of the Cupa României.

Players

First-team squad

Out on loan

Transfers

Pre-season and friendlies

Competitions

Overall record

Liga I

Regular season

Results summary

Results by round

Matches

Play-out round

Results summary

Results by round

Matches

Cupa României

Statistics

Appearances and goals

References

AFC Chindia Târgoviște
AFC Chindia Târgoviște